Chesterton is a former mining village in the unparished area of Newcastle-under-Lyme, in the Newcastle-under-Lyme district, in Staffordshire, England.

Chesterton is the second largest individual ward in the Borough of Newcastle-under-Lyme. In the 2011 census, Chesterton's population stood at 7,421.

History

Roman Chesterton
Chesterton was the site of a Roman fort, built on an area now occupied by Chesterton Community Sports College. There is little indication of how long the fort was in use but it is believed to have been constructed in the late 1st Century AD. A vicus was built at nearby Holditch, where it is believed that some inhabitants may have mined for coal.

There have been various excavations at the site. Excavations in 1895 revealed the fort's vallum, fosse (moat) and parts of the east and west defensive structures. Later excavations in 1969 uncovered further sections of the eastern ramparts.

Later history
Chesterton was formerly a township in Wolstanton parish and chapelry in Wolstanton and Audley parishes, on 31 December Chesterton became a parish in its own right, it was in the Wolstanton Rural District from 1894 to 1904. Following that, it became part of the Wolstanton United Urban District until 1932, when it was added to the Borough of Newcastle-under-Lyme. On 1 April 1932 the parish was abolished and merged with Newcastle-under-Lyme. In 1931 the parish had a population of 6861.
The main employer in Chesterton was Holditch Colliery. The colliery employed 1,500 men and mined ironstone in addition to coal. Despite heavy investment in the 1960s and 1970s the colliery closed down in 1988, just three years after the end of the year-long miners' strike. Many of the miners transferred to nearby Silverdale Colliery, which itself closed down on Christmas Eve 1998. The current site of Holditch Colliery is now a large business park.

Holditch Colliery disaster

The Holditch Colliery disaster was a coal mining accident occurring on 2 July 1937 at the Holditch Colliery, which at one point was the main employer in the village. In total, 30 men died and eight were injured. An investigation was conducted into the incident. The original fire was concluded to  have originated in the coal cutting machine and was due to frictional heat produced by the picks in the cut with subsequent explosions being caused by firedamp. The investigation concluded that the rescue plans were insufficient and adopted to save costs at the expense of lives. Today a memorial stands to the victims at Apedale Heritage Centre.

Education
There are four primary schools in the village: Churchfields Primary, Chesterton Primary, Crackley Bank Primary and St. Chad's Primary; and one Secondary school: Chesterton Community Sports College.

Religion
Chesterton is home to five churches: Holy Trinity  Church, Elim Pentecostal Church, St Johns the Evangelist Church, Chesterton United Reform Church, and St Chad's Church.

Places of interest

Apedale Community Country Park
Apedale Heritage Centre
Moseley Railway Trust
Loomer Road Stadium

Notable people
 Arthur Dobson (1893–1918) footballer
 Arthur Turner (1909–1994) football player and manager
 Ken Downing (1917–2004)  motor racing driver
 Frank Bowyer (1922–1999) footballer
 Jackie Trent (1940–2015) singer & songwriter
 Mike Pejic (born 1950) footballer
 Tony Loska (born 1950) footballer
 Ian Moores (1954–1998) footballer
 Mel Pejic (born 1959)  footballer
 Aaron Ramsdale (born 1998) footballer

See also
Listed buildings in Newcastle-under-Lyme

References

External links

 Roman Fort at Chesterton
 Apedale Heritage Centre and Country Park
 The Moseley Railway Trust website

Tourist attractions in Staffordshire
Villages in Staffordshire
Former civil parishes in Staffordshire
Newcastle-under-Lyme